Thamassu  is a 2010 Indian Kannada film written directed by journalist Agni Shridhar, starring Shiva Rajkumar and Padmapriya. The movie was released on 11 June 2010 and received extremely positive reviews. The story was inspired by a Hindu-Muslim incident in the aftermath of the 2002 Gujarat communal riots.

Cast

 Shiva Rajkumar as Shankar
 Padmapriya as Shanti
 Nassar as Nasser Khan
 Sharath Lohitashwa
 Harshika Poonacha as Amrin Sabha
 Yash as Imran (cameo appearance)
 Sudha Belawadi
 Sudha Rani
 Shobhraj
 Jai Jagadeesh

Production
Thamassu started its shooting at Kanteerava Studios on 23 October 2009. It was shot in and around Bangalore.

Music
The music was scored by Sandeep Chowta with lyrics penned by Agni Shridhar and Ramya.

Reception

Critical response 

Shruti Indira Lakshminarayana of Rediff scored the film at 3 out of 5 stars and says "Sandeep Chowta's music and Ramya and Agni Shridhar's lyrics go hand in hand, but a few songs could have been done away with. The cinematography also stands out in some scenes. Thamassu is a film that makes you think". A critic from The Times of India scored the film at 4 out of 5 stars and wrote "Sharath Lohithashwa is excellent. While Sundaranatha Suvarna is brilliant in camera work, Sandeep Chowta is equally good as a music director. Ramya Sridhar makes her debut as a lady lyricist by penning three songs. It's a movie for the class and the mass". B S Srivani from Deccan Herald wrote "Shivanna and Padmapriya offers some freshness but only that. Harshikaa impresses with an improved and restrained performance. Asif, Jai Jagadish, Nasser, Sharath Lohitashwa are all aptly cast. Sandeep Chowta, Nrutanrutya and the art department have worked hard to translate their director’s vision, which cannot escape loopholes. “Tamassu” may disappoint the average Shivanna “abhimani” but is a better product from a ‘debutant’ director"  A critic from Bangalore Mirror wrote  "The background music is loud and hampers a decent sleep while watching the film. The camerawork is better than most other aspects of the film. Sukadhare’s break from filmmaking has not worked for him or the audience".

Awards
On 25 October Karnataka State Film Awards for the year 2010-11 adjudged Thamassu as the second best film.
Award consists of cash prize Rs 75,000 and 100 gram silver medal each for director and producer.

Shivrajkumar won Filmfare Award for Best Actor for his performance in the film.

The Movie also received two awards for individual performances. Best supporting actress and Best screenplay writer done by Harshika Poonacha and Agni Shridhar respectively.

References

External links 

2010s Kannada-language films
2010 films
Films scored by Sandeep Chowta
India–Pakistan relations in popular culture